Garifuna (Karif) is a minority language widely spoken in villages of Garifuna people in the western part of the northern coast of Central America.

It is a member of the Arawakan language family but an atypical one since it is spoken outside the Arawakan language area, which is otherwise now confined to the northern parts of South America, and because it contains an unusually high number of loanwords, from both Carib languages and a number of European languages because of an extremely tumultuous past involving warfare, migration and colonization.

The language was once confined to the Antillean islands of St. Vincent and Dominica, but its speakers, the Garifuna people, were deported by the British in 1797 to the north coast of Honduras from where the language and Garifuna people has since spread along the coast south to Nicaragua and north to Guatemala and Belize.

Parts of Garifuna vocabulary are split between men's speech and women's speech, and some concepts have two words to express them, one for women and one for men. Moreover, the terms used by men are generally loanwords from Carib while those used by women are Arawak.

The Garifuna language was declared a Masterpiece of the Oral and Intangible Heritage of Humanity in 2008 along with Garifuna music and dance.

Distribution
Garifuna is spoken in Central America, especially in Honduras (146,000 speakers), but also in Guatemala (20,000 speakers), Belize (14,100 speakers), Nicaragua (2,600 speakers), and the US, particularly in New York City, where it is spoken in Queens, Brooklyn and the Bronx, and in Houston, which has had a community of Central Americans since the 1980s. The first feature film in the Garifuna language, Garifuna in Peril, was released in 2012.

Sociolinguistic history 
The Garinagu (singular Garifuna) are a mix of West/Central African, Arawak, and Carib ancestry. Though they were captives removed from their homelands, these people were never documented as slaves. The two prevailing theories are that they were the survivors of two recorded shipwrecks or they somehow took over the ship on which they came. The more Western and Central African-looking people were deported by the British from Saint Vincent to islands in the Bay of Honduras in 1796.
 
Their linguistic ancestors, Carib people, who gave their name to the Caribbean, once lived throughout the Lesser Antilles, and although their language is now extinct there, ethnic Caribs still live on Dominica, Trinidad, Saint Lucia, and Saint Vincent. The Caribs had conquered the previous population of the islands, Arawakan peoples like the Taino and Palikur peoples. During the conquest, which was conducted primarily by men, the Carib took Arawakan women for wives. Children were raised by their mothers speaking Arawak, but as boys came of age, their fathers taught them Carib, a language still spoken in mainland South America. 

Descriptions of Island Carib people in the 17th century missionaries from Europe record the use of two languages: Carib as spoken by the men, and Arawak as spoken by the women. It is conjectured that the males retained the core Carib vocabulary while the grammatical structure of their language mirrored that or Arawak. As such, Island Carib as spoken by males is considered either a mixed language or a relexified language.

Vocabulary 
The vocabulary of Garifuna is composed as follows:
45% Arawak (Igneri)
25% Carib (Kallínagu)
15% French
10% English
5% Spanish or English technical terms

Also, there also some few words from African languages.

Comparison to Carib

Gender differences
Relatively few examples of diglossia remain in common speech. For example, there are distinct Carib and Arawak words for "man" and "women", four words altogether, but in practice, the generic term  "person" is used by both men and women and for both men and women, with grammatical gender agreement on a verb, adjective, or demonstrative, distinguishing whether  refers to a man or to a woman ( "the man",  "the woman").

There remains, however, a diglossic distinction in the grammatical gender of many inanimate nouns, with abstract words generally being considered grammatically feminine by men and grammatically masculine by women. Thus, the word  may mean either concrete "sun" or abstract "day"; with the meaning of "day", most men use feminine agreement, at least in conservative speech, while women use masculine agreement. The equivalent of the abstract impersonal pronoun in phrases like "it is necessary" is also masculine for women but feminine in conservative male speech.

Grammar

Personal pronouns 
Independent personal pronouns in Garifuna distinguish the social gender of the speaker:

The forms au and amürü are of Cariban origin, and the others are of Arawakan origin.

Number 
Garifuna distinguishes singular and plural numbers. The marking of in nouns is realized through suffixes:

isâni "child" – isâni-gu "children"
wügüri "man" – wügüri-ña "men"
hiñaru "woman" – hiñáru-ñu "women"
itu "sister" – ítu-nu "sisters"

The plural of Garífuna is Garínagu.

Possession 
Possession on nouns is expressed by personal prefixes:

ibágari "life"
n-ibágari "my life"
b-ibágari "your (singular) life"
l-ibágari "his life"
t-ibágari "her life"
wa-bágari "our life"
h-ibágari "your (plural) life"
ha-bágari "their life"

Verb 
For the Garifuna verb, the grammatical tense, grammatical aspect, grammatical mood, negation, and person (both subject and object) are expressed by affixes, partly supported by particles.

The paradigms of grammatical conjugation are numerous.

Examples 
The conjugation of the verb alîha "to read" in the present continuous tense:
n-alîha-ña "I am reading"
b-alîha-ña "you (singular) are reading"
l-alîha-ña "he is reading"
t-alîha-ña "she is reading"
wa-lîha-ña "we are reading"
h-alîha-ña "you (plural) are reading"
ha-lîha-ña "they are reading"

The conjugation of the verb alîha "to read" in the simple present tense:
alîha-tina "I read"
alîha-tibu "you (singular) read"
alîha-ti "he reads"
alîha-tu "she reads"
alîha-tiwa "we read"
alîha-tiü "you (plural) read"
alîha-tiñu "they (masculine) read"
alîha-tiña "they (feminine) read"

There are also some irregular verbs.

Numerals 
From "3" upwards, the numbers of Garifuna are exclusively of French origin and are based on the vigesimal system, which, in today's French, is apparent at "80":

1 = aban
2 = biñá, biama, bián
3 =  (< )
4 = gádürü (< quatre)
5 = seingü (< cinq)
6 = sisi (< six)
7 = sedü (< sept)
8 = widü (< huit)
9 = nefu (< neuf)
10 = dîsi (< dix)
11 = ûnsu (< onze)
12 = dûsu (< douze)
13 = tareisi (< treize)
14 = katorsu (< quatorze)
15 = keinsi (< quinze)
16 = dîsisi, disisisi (< "dix-six" → seize)
17 = dîsedü, disisedü (< dix-sept)
18 = dísiwidü (< dix-huit)
19 = dísinefu (< dix-neuf)
20 = wein (< vingt)
30 = darandi (< trente)
40 = biama wein (< 2 X vingt → quarante)
50 = dimí san (< "demi cent" → cinquante)
60 = ürüwa wein (< "trois-vingt" → soixante)
70 = ürüwa wein dîsi (< "trois-vingt-dix" → soixante-dix)
80 = gádürü wein (< quatre-vingt)
90 = gádürü wein dîsi (< quatre-vingt-dix)
100 = san (< cent)
1,000 = milu (< mil)
1,000,000 = míñonu (< engl. ?)

The use of French borrowings rather than Carib or Arawak terms is unclear, but may have to do with their succinctness, as numbers in indigenous American languages, especially those above ten, tend to be longer and more cumbersome.

Phonology 

[o] and [e] are allophones of /ɔ/ and /ɛ/.

Syntax 
The word order is verb–subject–object (VSO, fixed).

Morphology 
Garifuna is an agglutinative language.

Notes

References

External links 

 Garifuna Research Institute
Universal Declaration of Human Rights: Garifuna version (sample text)
A Caribbean Vocabulary Compiled in 1666 (lists of older Garifuna words) at Internet Archive
Garifuna, Endangered Language Alliance

Language
Arawakan languages
Indigenous languages of Central America
Languages of Honduras
Languages of Belize
Languages of Guatemala
Languages of Nicaragua
Verb–object–subject languages
Masterpieces of the Oral and Intangible Heritage of Humanity
Languages of the African diaspora